Trilogija 3: Ambasadori loše volje (Serbian Cyrillic: Трилогија 3: Амбасадори лоше воље, trans. Trilogy 3: Badwill Ambassadors) is the third EP from Serbian and former Yugoslav rock band Riblja Čorba. It is the third and the final part of the Riblja Čorba trilogy released during 2005 and 2006. The band considers EPs Trilogija 1: Nevinost bez zaštite, Trilogija 2: Devičanska ostrva and Trilogija 3: Ambasadori loše volje three parts of the studio album titled Trilogija, although all three were released separately. All the songs from three EPs were released on the compilation album Trilogija.

Song Prezir is used in film Uslovna sloboda.

Track listing

Personnel
Bora Đorđević - vocals
Vidoja Božinović - guitar
Miša Aleksić - bass guitar, co-producer
Vicko Milatović - drums
Nikola Zorić - keyboards, recorded by

Additional personnel
Choir on "Prezir":
Biljana Krstić
Aleksandra Marković
Biljana Stresina
Marija Novović
Radovan Dikanović
Aleksandar Radulović
Andreja Rackov
Uroš Bojanić
Milan Popović - producer
Oliver Jovanović - engineer, mixed by, mastered by

References
Trilogija 3: Ambasadori loše volje at Discogs
 EX YU ROCK enciklopedija 1960-2006,  Janjatović Petar;

External links
Trilogija 3: Ambasadori loše volje at Discogs

Riblja Čorba EPs
2006 EPs